Sini Jose (born 25 May 1987) is an Indian sprint athlete from Ernakulam district, Kerala who specializes in 400 metres. Sini won the Gold Medal at the 2010 Commonwealth Games and 2010 Asian Games in 4x400 m relay event with Manjeet Kaur, A. C. Ashwini, and Mandeep Kaur.

Biography
Sini hails from Avoly, a village in Muvattupuzha, Ernakulam district, Kerala. Born to Mundackal Jose Joseph and Rithamma Jose, Sini is an employee of Indian Railways at Ernakulam.

Her personal best for 400 m is 53.01 s achieved during the Federation Cup athletics meet in Ranchi on 2 May 2010 where she won a gold medal.

References

External links
 

Living people
1987 births
Doping cases in athletics
Indian sportspeople in doping cases
Sportswomen from Kerala
People from Muvattupuzha
Commonwealth Games gold medallists for India
Athletes (track and field) at the 2010 Commonwealth Games
Asian Games medalists in athletics (track and field)
Athletes (track and field) at the 2010 Asian Games
Indian female sprinters
21st-century Indian women
21st-century Indian people
Asian Games gold medalists for India
Commonwealth Games medallists in athletics
Medalists at the 2010 Asian Games
Medallists at the 2010 Commonwealth Games